is a combative quick-draw sword technique. This art of drawing the Japanese sword, katana, is one of the Japanese koryū martial art disciplines in the education of the classical warrior (bushi).

Purpose
Iaijutsu is a combative sword-drawing art but not necessarily an aggressive art because iaijutsu is also a counterattack-oriented art. Iaijutsu technique may be used aggressively to wage a premeditated surprise attack against an unsuspecting enemy. The formulation of iaijutsu as a component system of classical bujutsu was made less for the dynamic situations of the battlefield than for the relatively static applications of the warrior's daily life off the field of battle.

Etymology
Historically, it is unclear when the term "iaijutsu" originated. It is also unclear when techniques to draw katana from the scabbard were first practiced as a dedicated form of exercise. The Japanese sword has existed since the Nara period (710–794), where techniques to draw the sword have been practiced under other names than 'iaijutsu'. The term 'iaijutsu' was first verified in connection with Iizasa Chōisai Ienao (c. 1387 – c. 1488), founder of the school Tenshin Shōden Katori Shintō-ryū.

History
Archaeological excavations dated the oldest sword in Japan from at least as early as second century B.C.  The Kojiki (Record of Ancient Matters) and the Nihon Shoki (History of Japan), ancient texts on early Japanese history and myth that were compiled in the eighth century A.D., describe iron swords and swordsmanship that pre-date recorded history, attributed to the mythological age of the gods (kami).

The development of Japanese swordsmanship as a component system of classical bujutsu created by and for professional warriors (bushi), begins only with the invention and widespread use of the Japanese sword, the curved, single-cutting-edged long sword.
In its curved form, the sword is known to the Japanese as tachi in the eighth century.  It evolved from and gained ascendancy over its straight-bladed prototype because years of battlefield experience proved that the curved form of sword was better suited to the needs of the bushi than the straight-bladed kind. Around the curved long sword the bushi built a mystique of fantastic dimensions, one that still influences Japanese culture today.  The nature of the bushi's combative deployment, mounted as he was on horseback, required the classical warrior to reach out for his enemy, who might either be similarly mounted or otherwise ground-deployed.

During the Kamakura period (1185–1333) the Japanese sword smiths achieved the highest level of technical excellence and because the war between two influential families, the Minamoto and the Taira, made it possible to test and evaluate swords under the severest of conditions.  By the end of the Kamakura period the tachi was superseded by a shorter weapon in a new form, called katana.

It was with the general widespread use of the curved sword mounted and worn as a katana that classical Japanese swordsmanship for infantry applications really begins. The earliest reliable documentation to prove that the bushi practiced swordsmanship in a systematic manner is dated in the 15th century. In this connection it is believed that kenjutsu, which deals with the art of swordsmanship as it is performed with an unsheathed sword, is the preceding form of iaijutsu.

Iaijutsu is extant today, but there also exists a modern form for drawing the Japanese sword called iaido, a term which first appeared in 1932.

Postures
According to Donn F. Draeger, iaijutsu is a combative art and, therefore, the warrior considered only two starting positions in the execution of a sword-drawing technique:
 The first technique is the low crouching posture named iai-goshi.
 The second is the standing posture named tachi-ai.

Two other postures are not used in iaijutsu because they possessed technical issues that would place their users at a disadvantage:
 The seated posture, tate-hiza, does not permit all-around mobility.
 Seiza, the formal kneeling-sitting posture, is a "dead" posture which is regarded by the warrior as less combatively efficient.
It would be difficult for the swordsman using either of these two postures to go quickly into action in an emergency.

Koryū Schools
Some of the Ryū that still exist and include iaijutsu in their curriculum are listed below - these schools are koryū, or arts developed before the Meiji era:

 Musō Jikiden Eishin-ryū—Traces back to the Hayashizaki-ryū Iai of Hayashizaki Jinsuke (Late 15th century).
 Suiō-ryū Iai Kenpō—Founded around 1600 by Mima Yoichizaemon Kagenobu.
 Shin Shin Sekiguchi-ryū—founded by Sekiguchi Yorokuuemon Ujimune.
 Mugai-ryū—Founded in 1693 by Tsuji Gettan Sukemochi, who had previously learned Yamaguchi-ryū kenjutsu. The iai-jutsu is transmitted ryuha, it is from Jikyo-ryu ii founded Taga Gon-nai.
 Jigen-ryū—Founded by Tōgō Hizen-no-kami Shigetada, its lineage traces back to the Shintō-ryū of Iizasa Chōisai Ienao.
 Tenshin Shōden Katori Shintō-ryū—Founded in the 15th century by Iizasa Chōisai Ienao.
 Tamiya Shinken-ryu—A branch of the Tamiya-ryu in Saijo-han (17th century), arranged by Tsumaki Seirin  in the 20th century.
 Yagyū Seigo-ryu—Founded by Nagaoka Torei Fusashige in the 17th century.
 Yagyū Shinkage-ryū—From the Shinkage-ryū of Yagyū Muneyoshi, who studied under Kamiizumi Nobutsuna in the 16th century.
 Yoshin-ryū—from the Yoshin-ryū founded by Akiyama Shirobei Yoshitoki in the mid 17th century.
 Shin-Tamiya-ryuーFounded by Wada Heisuke in 17th century.
 Hoki-ryuーA branch of the Tamiya-ryu, founded by Katayama Hoki-no-kami Hisayasu in 17th century. Hoshino-ha Hoki-ryu in Kumamoto spread to other areas.
 Hayashizaki-Shin-Muso-ryuーFounded by Hayashizaki Jinsuke Shigenobu in 16th century.
 Ishiguro-ryuーA part of the Ishiguro-ryu Jujutsu, Founded by Ishiguro Ansai in 19th century.
 Kageyama-ryuーFounded by Kageyama Kiyoshige in 16th century.
 Shingyotoh-ryuーFounded by Iba-Hideaki in 17th century.
Ittō-ryūーancestor school of several Japanese Koryū kenjutsu styles; was developed by Ittōsai Kagehisa

See also

Battōjutsu
Iaidō
Fast draw
Kendo
Kenjutsu

References

External links

 
 

Japanese swordsmanship
Ko-ryū bujutsu